Big Governors Creek is a  long 3rd order tributary to the Deep River in Lee and Moore Counties, North Carolina.  This creek forms the Lee-Moore county line, in part and is the only stream of this name in the United States.

Variant names
According to the Geographic Names Information System, it has also been known historically as:
Governors Creek
Millstone Creek

Course
Big Governors Creek rises about 0.5 miles southwest of White Hill in Moore County and then flows northwest and north to join the Deep River about 1.5 miles southeast of Haw Branch, North Carolina.

Watershed
Big Governors Creek drains  of area, receives about 48.4 in/year of precipitation, and has a wetness index of 380.16 and is about 65% forested.

See also
List of rivers of North Carolina

References

Rivers of North Carolina
Rivers of Lee County, North Carolina
Rivers of Moore County, North Carolina